"Dark & Long" is a song by British electronic music group Underworld and the opening track on their third studio album, dubnobasswithmyheadman (1994). The band released a number of versions of the track, including the "Dark Train" mix made popular for inclusion on the hit soundtrack album for the 1996 film Trainspotting, and the 2021 "Drift 2 Dark Train" mix.

Background 
The single entered the UK Singles Chart at number 57 on 25 June 1994 for one week.

The "Dark Train" mix of "Dark & Long" became best known due to its use in the 1996 film Trainspotting (that featured another Underworld track, "Born Slippy (.Nuxx))." "Dark & Long (Dark Train)" appears in a scene of when the main character Mark Renton is going through heroin withdrawal.

"Dark & Long (Dark Train)", as well as the "Darren Price and High Contrast Remix", both appeared during the athletes' march at the opening ceremony of the London 2012 Olympics and on its soundtrack album Isles of Wonder.

Track listings 
All tracks were written, mixed and produced by Rick Smith, Karl Hyde and Darren Emerson unless otherwise noted.

12-inch vinyl 1
 "Dark & Long" (Dark Train mix) – 10:21
 "Dark & Long" (Burts mix) – 8:47

12-inch vinyl 2
 "Dark & Long" (Spoon Deep mix)
 "Dark & Long" (Thing in a Book mix)

CD single
 "Dark & Long" (Hall's edit) – 4:08 (Hyde/Smith)
 "Dark Train" – 9:51
 "Most 'Ospitable" – 5:52
 "215 Miles" – 20:02

April Records EP
 "Dark & Long" (7-inch) – 4:07 (Hyde/Smith)
 "Thing in a Book" – 20:12
 "Spoon Deep" – 17:53
 "Dark Hard" – 11:30
 "Dark Train" – 10:28
 "Burts" – 8:47

12-inch vinyl 3 (2021)
 "Dark & Long" (Drift 2 Dark Train) – 10:11
 "Dark & Long" (Most Ospitable mix) – 5:57
 "Dark & Long" (Dark Train) – 9:53
(Tracks 2 and 3 are the 2014 remastered versions)

Charts

References 

Underworld (band) songs
1994 singles
1994 songs
Songs written by Darren Emerson
Songs written by Karl Hyde
Songs written by Rick Smith (musician)